Marcel Chyrzyński (born in 1971) is a Polish composer. He has been described as "a polystylist with an enormous sense of humour, and a lover of rhythm and jazz improvisation". Chyrzyński's works have been performed throughout Europe, as well as in South Korea, Australia, New Zealand, Japan, the USA and Canada.

He completed a master's degree at the Academy of Music in Kraków in 1995, where he studied composition with Marek Stachowski, orchestration with Krzysztof Penderecki, and computer music with Marek Choloniewski, Richard Boulanger, Cindy McTee and Rodney Oaks. Since 1994 he has been a lecturer at the Academy of Music in Kraków, and in 2010 became an associated professor in the Departament of Composition, Conducting and Theory of Music. In 1998 he was awarded a doctorate in composition. Since 2014 he has been a director of the Institute of Composition, Conducting and Music Theory.

Chyrzyński has received many awards and prizes, including 1st prize in the A.Krzanowski Competition for Young Composers in Bielsko-Biała, 1st prize at the 3rd All-Polish Adam Didur Composers' Competition in Sanok (1994), a citation in the Composers' Competition of the Polish Radio in Warsaw (1996), 3rd prize at the 2nd All-Polish Composition Competition Musica Sacra in Warsaw (1996), 3rd prize at the 3rd All-Polish Composers' Competition Musica Sacra in Warsaw (1997), and 1st prize at the Tadeusz Baird Composition Competition for Young Composers in Warsaw (1997).

In 1995 Chyrzyński became a member of the Polish Composers' Union, and at various times has served on that organisation's board. In 2005 he became a member of the Polish Society for Electroacoustic Music. Since 2014 Chyrzyński has been the director of the International Festival of Kraków Composers.

The list of compositions below is sourced from the composer's official website.

Orchestral works
Extended Perception of Echo* for Strings, 1992 (ca 7’30’’) – (8,8,8,8,4) or (6,5,4,4,4)
La Musique d’adieu pour orchestre à cordes*, 1993 (ca 13’30’’) – (6,5,4,3,2)
Piece for String Orchestra*, 1994/95 (ca 9’) – (6,5,4,3,2)
Piece for Orchestra*, 1994/95 (ca 9’) – (2,2,2,2/4,2,2,0/tmp/strings)
Trans-At-LAN-Tic*, 2006 (ca 7’35’’) – for symphony orchestra and tape, (3,3,3,2,1/4,3,2,1/3batt+tmp/pfte/strings)
Ukiyo-e*, 2012 (ca 12’) – for string orchestra (6,5,4,3,1)

Work for soloist and orchestra
Concerto 2000*, 1999/2000 (ca 26’) – for clarinet and symphony orchestra (cl solo/3,3,3,3/4,2,2,1/2batt+tmp/ar/pfte/strings)
Chamber Concerto 2000*, 1999/2000 (ca 26’) – for clarinet and string orchestra (cl solo/6,5,4,3,2) 2nd version of Concerto 2000
Meditation No. 1*, 2010/11 (ca 15’30’’) – for alto saxophone and symphony orchestra (sax solo/3,3,3,3/4,3,3,1/batt (4esec)/ar/pfte/strings 16,12,9,8,6)
Malchera*, 2014 (ca 16’) – for harp and symphony orchestra (ar solo/2,2,2,2/4,2,2,1/batt (4esec)/ar/pfte/strings 16,12,9,8,6)
War Game*, 2014/15 (ca 17’) – Concerto for alto saxophone and large chamber ensemble (sax solo/1,1,1,1/1,1,1,0/batt (2esec)/ar/pfte/strings 1,1,1,1,1)
Ukiyo-e No. 2*, 2015 (ca 18’) – Concerto for flute and symphony orchestra (fl solo/2,2,2,2/4,2,2,0/batt (1esec)/cel/strings)
Ukiyo-e No. 3*, 2016 (ca 19’) – Concerto for violoncello and symphony orchestra (vc solo/3,3,3,3/4,3,3,1/batt (3esec)/hp/pfte/strings)

Chamber music
Three Preludes*, 1990 (ca 4’) – for clarinet and piano
Three dialogues*, 1993/94 (ca 11’-12’) – for oboe and bassoon
In C*, 1996 (ca 6’) – for clarinet, viola (cello) and piano
Ferragosto per tromba, pianoforte e batteria*, 1997 (ca 17’) – batt (3esec)
Tribute To Miles*, 1999 (ca 8’40’’) – for trumpet and one percussion player
Reflection No. 1*, 2003 (ca 9') – for string quartet
Strade di Venezia*, 2005/6 (ca 11’) – for flute, clarinet and bassoon
Dry Pieces*, 2007/8 (ca 9’) – for woodwind quintet
Reflection No. 3*, 2013 (ca 10’30’’) – for two pianos
Farewell*, 2013 (ca 10’30’’) – for violoncello and piano
Dance of Death*, 2013 (ca 5’) – for clarinet and piano
Betelgeuse*, 2014 (ca 10’30’’) – for violin, violoncello and piano
Haiku No. 2*, 2016 (ca 6’) – for clarinet and piano
Reflection No. 4*, 2016 (ca 13') – for flute, clarinet, violoncello, percussion and piano (percussion 1 player: 2 suspended cymbals, 1 large tam-tam, vibraphone)
Donghwasa*, 2017 (ca 9’) – for violin, sanjo gayageum and piano

Solo works
Miniatura*, 1988 (ca 4’) – for solo clarinet
For you', 1991 (ca 3’) – for solo vibraphone
Quasi Kwazi*, 1994 (ca 2’45’’) – for solo clarinet
Quasi Kwazi II*, 1997 (ca 4’45’’) – for solo clarinet
Quasi Kwazi III*, 1998 (ca 7’) – for solo clarinet
ForMS...*, 2001 (ca 7') – for solo cello
Reflection No. 2*, 2005 (ca 4’22’’) – for solo harpsichord

Vocal works
Pamiętam...  / I Do Remember...*  1992 (ca 9’30’’) – for soprano and string quartet. Text: Jan Kasprowicz
Cztery liryki miłosne* / Four Love Lyrics, 1994 (ca 12’) – for baritone and piano. Text: Kazimierz Przerwa-Tetmajer, Bolesław Leśmian
Fuyu no sakura*, 2011 (ca 11’25’’) – for mezzo-soprano and violoncello. Text: Shinkawa Kazue
Psalm 88*, 1996 (9’50’’) – for unaccompanied mixed choir (SS, AA, TT, BB)
Per diem clamavi in nocte coram te*, 1996/97 (ca 11') – for unaccompanied mixed choir (SS, AA, TT, BB)
2nd version of Psalm 88
...similes esse bestiis*, 1997 (ca 5’) – for unaccompanied mixed choir (SS, AA, TT, BB). Text: Ecclesiastes
Psalm 23* (Dominus regit me), 2013 (6’) – for unaccompanied mixed choir (SS, AA, TT, BB)

Elactro-acoustic and electronic works
Haiku*, 1991 (ca 12’30’’) – for voice, clarinet (EWI), processing and computer
Nju MoDeL*, 1994 (ca 10') – for clarinet, processing and computer
Coś tam underground*, 1994 (ca 9') – for trumpet, viola, double bass, percussion and computer
Überraschung Cfaj*, 1995/96 (ca 5') – for clarinet, processing, two synthesisers and computer
EXCH-33*, 2002 (ca 7’30’’) – for EWI (electronic wind instrument) and tape
Mahamudra*, 2006 (ca 10’09’’) – for electronic sounds
Beelden*, 2006 (ca 15’) – for amplified blockflute, harpsichord and tape

References

External links
Official Marcel Chyrzyński website
Biography at PWM Edition
Marcel Chyrzyński on YouTube

1971 births
20th-century classical composers
21st-century classical composers
Polish classical composers
Polish male classical composers
Living people
20th-century male musicians
21st-century male musicians